Milligan is a village in Fillmore County, Nebraska, United States. The population was 241 at the 2020 census.

History
Milligan was laid out in 1887 when the railroad was extended to that point. It was named for a railroad official.

Geography
Milligan is located at  (40.498949, -97.388390).

Demographics

2010 census
At the 2010 census there were 285 people, 129 households, and 81 families in the village. The racial makup of the village was 97.5% White, 0.4% Native American, 0.4% Asian, 0.7% from other races, and 1.1% from two or more races. Hispanic or Latino people of any race were 1.1%.

Of the 129 households 24.0% had children under the age of 18 living with them, 51.2% were married couples living together, 3.1% had a female householder with no husband present, 8.5% had a male householder with no wife present, and 37.2% were non-families. 33.3% of households were one person and 18.6% were one person aged 65 or older. The average household size was 2.21 and the average family size was 2.79.

The median age in the village was 46.8 years. 22.5% of residents were under the age of 18; 5.6% were between the ages of 18 and 24; 19.3% were from 25 to 44; 27.1% were from 45 to 64; and 25.6% were 65 or older. The gender makeup of the village was 51.6% male and 48.4% female.

2000 census
At the 2000 census there were 315 people, 149 households, and 77 families in the village. The population density was 1,353.3 people per square mile (528.8/km2). There were 181 housing units at an average density of 777.6 per square mile (303.8/km2).  The racial makup of the village was 98.10% White, 0.95% Native American, and 0.95% from two or more races. Hispanic or Latino people of any race were 0.32%.

Of the 149 households 26.8% had children under the age of 18 living with them, 41.6% were married couples living together, 6.0% had a female householder with no husband present, and 47.7% were non-families. 44.3% of households were one person and 27.5% were one person aged 65 or older. The average household size was 2.11 and the average family size was 2.94.

The age distribution was 26.3% under the age of 18, 5.4% from 18 to 24, 25.1% from 25 to 44, 15.9% from 45 to 64, and 27.3% 65 or older. The median age was 42 years. For every 100 females, there were 84.2 males. For every 100 females age 18 and over, there were 81.3 males.

As of 2000 the median income for a household in the village was $24,327, and the median family income  was $27,727. Males had a median income of $21,719 versus $22,500 for females. The per capita income for the village was $12,654. About 19.7% of families and 18.1% of the population were below the poverty line, including 18.5% of those under age 18 and 18.1% of those age 65 or over.

Education
Milligan and the neighboring village of Exeter make up part of the Exeter-Milligan School District.

Milligan Auditorium
The Cesko-narodni sin-Milligan Auditorium was constructed in 1929. It serves as a meeting hall in the Czech community, and was added to the National Register of Historic Places in 1996.

Notable people
 Eddie Brown, baseball player
 Jeanne Combs, Nebraska legislator

References

Villages in Fillmore County, Nebraska
Villages in Nebraska
1887 establishments in Nebraska